Press Color is the debut album of French no wave singer, Lizzy Mercier Descloux. The album has received some critical acclaim, being called "the real thing" by Uncut magazine.

Track listing
All songs written by Lizzy Mercier Descloux unless otherwise noted. The song "Tumor" is more commonly known as "Fever," with the word "fever" replaced by "tumor" in this version's lyrics.

Original release

Side One
 "Jim on the Move" (Lalo Schifrin) 2:29
 "Aya Mood 3.5" 2:50
 "Torso Corso" 1:48
 "Wawa" 2:18

Side Two
 "Fire" (Arthur Brown) 5:11
 "Mission Impossible" (Schifrin) 2:35
 "No Golden Throat" 2:38
 "Tumor" (Eddie Cooley, John Davenport) 2:57

2003 reissue track listing
 "Fire" (Brown) 5:11
 "Torso Corso" 1:48
 "Mission Impossible" (Schifrin) 2:35
 "No Golden Throat" 2:38
 "Jim on the Move" (Schifrin) 2:29
 "Wawa" 2:18
 "Tumor" (Cooley, Davenport) 2:57
 "Aya Mood" 2:50
 "Mission Impossible 2.0" (Schifrin) 2:20
 "Rosa Vertov" (Descloux, D.J. Barnes) 1:43
 "Decryptated" (Descloux, Barnes) 1:20
 "Herpes Simplex" (Descloux, Barnes) 2:03
 "Lacrosse Baron Bic"(Descloux, Barnes) 1:36
 "Tso Xin Yu Xin" (Descloux, Barnes) 1:20
 "Nina Con Un Tercer Ojo" (Descloux, Barnes) 0:58
 "Birdy Num-num" 3:32
 "Hard Boiled Babe" 4:28
 "Morning High" (Rimbaud /Descloux, Patti Smith) 3:04

Tracks 10-15 are originally from the Rosa Yemen EP.
Tracks 16-18 are previously unreleased bonus tracks.

Personnel

Musicians
Lizzy Mercier Descloux - lead vocals, guitar, bass, percussion
D.J. Barnes - guitar, bass, percussion, backing vocals
Erik Elliasson - guitar, bass, keyboards, drums on "Wawa"
Jimmy Young - drums, percussion

Guests on "Fire"
Jack Cavari - guitars
Ken Smith - bass
Bud Maltin - saxophone
Chris Wiltshire, Mary-Jo Kaplan, Ramona Brooks - backing vocals
Victoria - percussion
Allen Wentz - synthesizer, sequencer

Guest on "Mission Impossible"
Allen Wentz - synthesizer, sequencer

Guest on "Tumour"
John Rome - guitars, backing vocals

Recorded by Bob Blank & Joe Arlotta at Blank Tapes Studio, NYC February 1979
Arranged, Producer & Mixed by Banes, Elliasson, Mercier Descloux
Except "Fire" Mixed by Tom Savarese
Executive Producer Michel Esteban

Sound
Original Sound Recording Made by ZE Records © 1978/1979/1980/2003
Executive Producer Michel Esteban
This Selection by Lizzy Mercier Descloux & Michel Esteban
Producer Michel Esteban p & © 2009 ZE Records Mundo Ltda

Design
Art Cover Design by Michel Esteban
Photos Credits : Front Cover 12 by Seth Tillet
Booklet Pages 2,8,912,12 by Seth Tillet • Page 5 by Edo •
Pages 6 & 14 by Michel Esteban •
Page 14 : Patti Smith & Lizzy as Isabelle & Arthur Rimbaud
Inspiration : Malevitch « Croix Noire » 1920 • Joseph Beuys « Gesundheitshotel » 1979 • Yves Klein « Monochrome Bleu » 1980

References

External links
Liner Notes Album

1979 debut albums
Lizzy Mercier Descloux albums
ZE Records albums